Gualaco is a municipality in the north of the Honduran department of Olancho, west of San Esteban, north of Santa Maria del Real and east of Guata.

Demographics
At the time of the 2013 Honduras census, Gualaco municipality had a population of 21,863. Of these, 97.11% were Mestizo, 1.76% White, 0.56% Indigenous, 0.50% Black or Afro-Honduran and 0.07% others.

References

Municipalities of the Olancho Department